The Zipser Germans, Zipser Saxons, or, simply, just Zipsers are a German-speaking (more specifically Zipser German-speaking) sub-ethnic group which developed in the Szepes County of Upper Hungary—today mostly north-eastern Slovakia—as that region was settled by colonists from present-day central Germany (and other parts of contemporary Germany) during the High Middle Ages, more specifically beginning in the mid 12th century, as part of the Ostsiedlung. Beginning in at least the 18th century, many members of this German ethnic sub-group migrated to southern Bukovina, Maramureș, and Transylvania (today in Romania). Former Slovak President Rudolf Schuster is partly Zipser German.

Occasionally, Zipser Germans are also referred to as Zipser Saxons, a name stemming from their geographic origin of initial settlement during medieval times corresponding to present-day Spiš region in north-eastern Slovakia. The county/komitat where they settled in the beginning is known in Hungarian as 'Szepes'. Alongside the Transylvanian Saxons in Transylvania, contemporary central Romania, the Zipser Germans are one of the two eldest German-speaking and ethnic German groups in Central-Eastern Europe, having continuously been living there since the High Middle Ages onwards.

The Zipser Germans can also be equated with the Germans of Slovakia and are part of the broader group of Carpathian Germans, having chiefly been referred to as such along with the Germans of Carpathian Ruthenia since the end of World War II onwards. They are also part of the Germans of Romania.

Medieval history 

German settlers were invited to settle in the Spiš region across the High Tatras, present-day Slovakia, then Szepes County of Upper Hungary in the Kingdom of Hungary, beginning in the mid 12th century by former King of Hungary Géza II of Hungary. These settlers' occupations ranged from miners and traders to builders. The last wave of German colonists arrived during the 15th century, towards the end of the Middle Ages (or the Late Middle Ages).

As in the cases of other historical regions from Central and Eastern Europe, this migration of German settlers at the invitation of local kings (known as Ostsiedlung in German historiography) from Central-Eastern Europe had the main goal to enrich the local medieval communities with more trade and urbanization as well as to fortify them in the wake of the Mongol invasion (as did the Transylvanian Saxons in Transylvania, another former region of the Kingdom of Hungary during the Middle Ages).

In the particular case of present-day Slovakia, these German settlers stemmed from lower Rhine river valley, Flanders, Saxony, and Silesia (in present-day south-eastern Poland). They governed themselves under the Zipser Willkür, a particular medieval German law (more specifically German town law) which they developed there under a certain degree of local autonomy provided by the Hungarian monarch. It is the oldest form of German law from Slovakia.

In the passing of time, as in the case of other local communities in Central-Eastern Europe colonized with ethnic Germans during the Middle Ages, these newly arrived German settlers became the dominant class and the majority ethnic group in the towns and villages they had founded. They eventually became collectively known as Zipser Germans given that they helped develop Szepes County. They are sometimes referred to as Zipser Saxons as well.

As in the case of the Transylvanian Saxons in Transylvania (another Central-Eastern European historical region which previously belonged to the medieval Kingdom of Hungary), the Zipser Germans founded imposing castles and fortified urban settlements.

Modern Age history 

During the Modern Age, as it was the case of other ethnic German groups from non-native German Central and Eastern European countries, the population of Zipser Germans gradually declined on the territory of contemporary Slovakia. Zipser German populations were still significant in several parts of central Slovakia though, but not as significant as they once were during the Middle Ages (both in absolute numbers and in social status). They also underwent forced Magyarization.

Beginning in at least the 18th century, many Zipser Germans from the territory of present-day Slovakia emigrated southward to Habsburg-ruled and, later on, Austrian-ruled Bukovina and also to Maramureș, where they established or intermixed in already established Romanian rural settlements but also settled in the towns. Many of them were miners, both in Bukovina and in Maramureș.

20th century and contemporary history 

During and after World War II, most Zipsers evacuated or were expelled to West Germany. A community of speakers remains in the Zips town of Chmeľnica (their distinctive dialect is called 'Outzäpsersch', literally Old Zipserish), and others remain in Romania where they and other German-speaking minority groups are currently represented by the Democratic Forum of Germans in Romania (FDGR/DFDR) at political, cultural, and administrative levels. 

Some notable localities in southern Bukovina (contemporary Suceava County) previously inhabited by a significant number of Zipser Germans include Iacobeni, Cârlibaba, and Fundu Moldovei. To this day, sparse Zipser German communities still reside in southern Bukovina and northern Transylvania, in Maramureș/Maramureș County more specifically, where they are also officially represented at political and administrative level (albeit only to a lesser extent) after the latest Romanian locations which were held in September 2020.

Nonetheless, most of the remaining Zipser Germans in Romania live in Maramureș, northern Transylvania. Therefore, the main localities still populated by Zipser Germans in Maramureș County according to the 2011 Romanian census are the following ones, both urban settlements (a town and a municipality):

 Vișeu de Sus
 Baia Mare

Historical occupations 

In general, all the more with respect to Maramureș and Bucovina, the Zipser Germans were mainly:

 Miners;
 Lumberjacks;
 Farmers.

Thus, from a historical point of view, their societies are mostly characterised by the rural character of their traditional occupations over the passing of time.

In medieval times, the historical occupations of the Zipser Germans in Slovakia were the following ones (as it was the case of other German-speaking groups during the Ostsiedlung as part of an emerging feudal system):

 Castle builders or fortification builders in general;
 Knights/soldiers;
 Blacksmiths;
 Carpenters;
 Cobblers (hence e.g. the family name Schuster);
 Miners;
 Lumberjacks;
 Farmers.

As opposed to the Modern Age societies of Zipser Germans in present-day Romania, the societies of Zipser German in medieval contemporary Slovakia had both a rural and urban character, also revitalising urbanisation on previously existing Slavic/Slovakian towns and cities.

Media 

In Slovakia, the Zipser Germans and the Carpathian Germans have their own monthly publication/newspaper which is called Karpatenblatt (the publication also has a Youtube channel).

Cultural and social life in Romania 

In Romania, the Zipser Germans hold a festival on yearly basis (just as other German-speaking and German-stemming ethnic minorities all across Romania) which is called Zipsertreff. The Zipsertreff is held in Vișeu de Sus in Maramureș and is a great celebration of the local Zipser German heritage and culture.

Notable Zipser Germans 

 Gerhard Cerny, writer
 Johann Generisch, historian
 Hugo Weczerka, historian

Gallery

See also 

 List of German names for places in Slovakia
 Province of 16 Szepes Towns
 Roman Catholic Diocese of Satu Mare
 Veľká Lomnica
 Kremnica
 Sabinov
 Dobšiná
 Prešov
 Medzev
 German Party (Slovakia)
 Zipser German Party
 Carpathian German Party
 Carpathian Germans
 Bukovina Germans
 Transylvanian Saxons
 Germans of Romania

References

Further reading 

 Povești din folclorul germanilor din România by Roland Schenn, Corint publishing house, 2014 (in Romanian)

Ethnic German groups in Romania
Ethnic groups in Slovakia
Ethnic groups in Transylvania
+Zipser
Spiš
Bukovina
Maramureș
Luxembourgian diaspora